Membrane-bound transcription factor site-2 protease, also known as S2P endopeptidase or site-2 protease (S2P), is an enzyme encoded by the  gene which liberates the N-terminal fragment of sterol regulatory element-binding protein (SREBP) transcription factors from membranes. S2P cleaves the transmembrane domain of SREPB, making it a member of the class of intramembrane proteases.

S2P catalyses the following chemical reaction

 Cleaves several transcription factors that are type-2 transmembrane proteins within membrane-spanning domains. Known substrates include sterol regulatory element-binding protein (SREBP)-1, SREBP-2 and forms of the transcriptional activator ATF6.

This enzyme belongs to the peptidase family M50.

Function 

This gene encodes an intramembrane zinc metalloprotease, which is essential in development. This protease functions in the signal protein activation involved in sterol control of transcription and the ER stress response. Mutations in this gene have been associated with ichthyosis follicularis with atrichia and photophobia (IFAP syndrome); IFAP syndrome has been quantitatively linked to a reduction in cholesterol homeostasis and ER stress response.[provided by RefSeq, Aug 2009].

See also 
 Membrane-bound transcription factor site-1 protease

References

External links 
 
 

EC 3.4.24